Suckapunch Records is an independent record label based in Lincoln, Nebraska, US. The label was operated from around 2002 to 2004 by a group of friends from Lincoln, Omaha, and Grand Island, Nebraska.

The label's original roster comprised four Nebraska bands - Settle for Less, The JV All*stars, Same Old Crap, and Fourth Time Around - but grew to work with bands across the United States. What began as an attempt by four bands of mutual friends to work together and pool money evolved into a small non-profit record label with the goal of promoting Midwest bands. Initially, they pooled entrance money collected at a number of label set-up shows, and this was set aside as a record pressing fund usable by any band on the label. The first release by Suckapunch Records was "The Everbimes" by Mr. 1986, an instrumental indie group from Lincoln and friends of the bands that established the label.

Built as a collective, bands releasing music with Suckapunch Records could borrow money to press finished recordings, provided the funds were repaid upon or shortly after the record's release. The label asked only for a number of finished recordings, rather than profit or borrowing fees. Those records were kept by the friends and bands within the label, given to radio stations and newspapers, and handed out as free gifts or promotions from the label.

Suckapunch Records attended the Vans Warped Tour in 2003 and 2004 to hand out free samplers of the labels spring compilations, and released more than a dozen recordings in its short existence.  In 2004, when many of the labels expanding lineup began to tour frequently, less resources were available for the label to remain active and Suckapunch Records has been quiet ever since.

Artists
 Fatty and the Twins
 Settle for Less
 Fourth Time Around
 Anchondo
 The Cover Story
 Good with Guns
 Haven 21
 The JV All*Stars
 Same Old Crap
 The Show is the Rainbow
 The Unies!

See also
 List of record labels

External links
 Official site

American independent record labels
Indie rock record labels